San José Xicohténcatl is a town of some 6,000 people in the municipality of Huamantla, in the eastern part of the Mexican state of Tlaxcala. It is about 7 km northeast of the city of Huamantla on the railroad from Jalapa to Puebla.

References

External links
Municipio de Huamantla Official website

Populated places in Tlaxcala